Peter Kildemand (born 1 September 1989) is a motorcycle speedway rider from Denmark.

Career
He is a member of the Danish national team. He was a member of the Swindon Robins Elite League Championship winning side of 2012 and was named "Rider of the Year" for the club at the end of the season. Kildemand was also part of the Fjelsted team that won the 2017 Danish Speedway League. He was captain of  Västervik Speedway team in 2018.

In 2022, he signed for King's Lynn Stars but was unable to race for them after sustaining a pre season injury. However, he later helped Smederna win the Swedish Speedway Team Championship during the 2022 campaign.

Results

World Championships 
 Individual U-21 World Championship
 2009 - 17th place in Semi-Final 2
 Team U-21 World Championship (Under-21 Speedway World Cup)
 2008 -  Holsted - Runner-up (1 pt)
 2010 -  Rye House - Under-21 World Champion (8 pts)
 Speedway Grand Prix 
 2015 -  Horsens - 1st place
 2016 -  Krško - 1st place

European Championships 
 2008 Individual Speedway Junior European Championship
 2008 -  Stralsund - 16th place (1 pt)

Domestic competitions 
 Team Polish Championship
 2007 - 4th place in 2007 Polish Speedway Second League (Average 0.500 in 2 heats) for Opole
 2008 - 5th place in 2008 Polish Speedway Second League (Average 1.143 in 7 heats) for Opole
 2009 - Second League for Piła

Speedway Grand Prix results

See also 
 Denmark national speedway team
 Workington Comets

References

External links 
 (pl) www.Speedway-Polonia-Pila.com
 (pl) www.SpeedwayPoloniaPila.pl
 (GBR) www.workingtonspeedway.co.uk

1989 births
Living people
Danish speedway riders
Team Speedway Junior World Champions